Spring Harbor Hospital is a 100-bed free-standing nonprofit psychiatric hospital located in Westbrook, Maine. It is one of two free standing psychiatric hospitals in the state of Maine and offers services for both children and adults.

History

Spring Harbor Hospital came into being in 1999 when Maine Medical Center purchased a for-profit psychiatric hospital, Jackson Brook Institute. In 2007, a donation from philanthropist Al Glickman created the Glickman Family Center for Child and Adolescent Psychiatry, which helps to support programs for families at Spring Harbor. The hospital originally had 88 beds, and in 2016, 12 more beds were added to address the growing need for psychiatric services in Southern Maine.

Services

Spring Harbor Hospital has 3 adult units totaling 60 beds. There is a child unit with 14 beds, an adolescent unit with 14 beds, and a 12-patient unit for those with developmental disorders. The units are named with respect to direction, 1NE, 1NW, etc.
Spring Harbor Hospital is affiliated with Maine Behavioral Healthcare (MBH), which is a division of MaineHealth, a non-profit healthcare organization in the state of Maine.

References

Psychiatric hospitals in Maine
Buildings and structures in Westbrook, Maine
Hospitals established in 1999
1999 establishments in Maine